is a Japanese manga series written by Buronson and illustrated by Ryoichi Ikegami. It was serialized in Shogakukan's seinen manga magazine Big Comic Superior from 1998 to 2004. It was adapted into a two live-action films which premiered in 2004.

In 2002, Heat won the 47th Shogakukan Manga Award for the general manga category.

Plot
The story follows a young man named , who suddenly rises in the criminal world of Shinjuku, Tokyo, and becomes the leader of a group of amateurs who show no reluctance to face police and gangs alike. His successes in the Tokyo underground cause a chief and a yakuza boss to create a conspiracy to eliminate him.

Media

Manga
Written by Buronson and illustrated by Ryoichi Ikegami, Heat was serialized in Shogakukan's seinen manga magazine Big Comic Superior from 1998 to 2004. Shogakukan collected its chapters in seventeen tankōbon volumes, released from March 30, 1999, to May 28, 2004.

Films
Two live action films distributed by KSS, Heat and Heat 2, premiered on February 14, 2004. Heat and Heat 2 were released on home video on April 9 and May 14, 2004, respectively.

Reception
Heat won the 47th Shogakukan Manga Award for the general manga category in 2002.

References

External links
 

Ryoichi Ikegami
Action anime and manga
Seinen manga
Shogakukan manga
Thriller anime and manga
Winners of the Shogakukan Manga Award for general manga
Yakuza in anime and manga
Yoshiyuki Okamura